Dry Summer (a.k.a. Reflections) is a 1964 black-and-white Turkish drama film, co-produced, co-written and directed by Metin Erksan based on a novel by Necati Cumalı, featuring Erol Taş as a tobacco farmer, who dams a river to irrigate his own property and ruin his competitors. It is also available in an English dubbed U.S. theatrical release titled Reflections produced by William Shelton and edited by David E. Durston.

Martin Scorsese has supported the film's preservation and it is available on DVD.

Plot
Osman decides to dam the spring on his property because he knows the summer will be too dry to support all the farmers who rely on its waters. His younger brother Hasan urges him not to dam the spring, but reluctantly goes along with him. The farmers are furious with Osman. They initiate a legal dispute. Osman is ordered to keep the spring open while the dispute is being resolved, but he disobeys this order. Hasan occasionally opens the dam out of pity for his neighbors, but Osman is quick to close it again.

Meanwhile, Hasan courts and marries a young woman named Bahar. On their wedding night, Osman bursts into their bedroom and orders Bahar to breed as many as 10 children for the family. Hasan has to put a dresser in front of the window to block out his drunken brother. Osman finds a crack in the wall and watches the consummation.

One of the farmers kills Osman's dog, prompting the brothers to keep watch at night to prevent further violence. That night, two farmers blow up the dam. Osman and Hasan chase the saboteurs. Osman fires several shots into the darkness, killing one of the farmers. He convinces Hasan to take the blame for the killing by arguing that Hasan is much younger and will get a lighter sentence.

Hasan is sentenced to 24 years, which is reduced to 8 because he was provoked. Osman uses his absence to advance on Bahar. He destroys Hasan's letters to make it appear as if he has forgotten Bahar. When a prisoner named Hasan is killed in the same prison as her husband, Bahar is distraught. She flees the farm and returns to her mother. Osman convinces her to return by explaining that, as Hasan's widow, she owns half of everything.

Hasan is not dead, and he is eventually pardoned. On his way home from prison, he learns how Osman has tricked Bahar. He goes straight to confront his brother. Osman shoots first at Bahar who runs at him with an axe. He shoots repeatedly at Hasan, but Hasan manages to topple his brother into the spring and drown him. Osman's body washes down the sluice towards the farms he had deprived of water.

Cast
 Erol Taş - Osman
 Ulvi Dogan - Hasan
 Hülya Koçyiğit - Bahar
 Alaettin Altiok
 Hakki Haktan
 Zeki Tüney
 Yavuz Yalinkiliç

Production
Dry Summer helped introduce Turkish cinema to a global audience. It continues a theme of possessiveness that Eksan had previously explored in Revenge of the Snakes.

The film was censured by the Ministry of Interior's film censorship board which objected to Bahar's implied union with her dead husband's brother. The film was banned for fear of broadcasting negative images of Turkish society.

Awards
The film won the Golden Bear at the 14th Berlin International Film Festival and the Biennale Award at the 25th Venice Film Festival. The film was also selected as the Turkish entry for the Best Foreign Language Film at the 37th Academy Awards, but was not accepted as a nominee.

Social Impact 
Social and individual themes are covered in the movie, as in Necati Cumalı’s Dry Summer story. The movie is about the right of property and the power struggle rising over land and water in a society in which agriculture-based production is dominant in the economy, a conflict such as the commodification and devaluation of women’s value and body. The power struggle between the Kocabaş brothers and the villagers is told in both legal and violent ways.

See also
 List of submissions to the 37th Academy Awards for Best Foreign Language Film
 List of Turkish submissions for the Academy Award for Best Foreign Language Film

References

External links 
 
Dry Summer: The Laws of Nature an essay by Bilge Ebiri at the Criterion Collection

1964 films
1964 drama films
Turkish drama films
Turkish black-and-white films
1960s Turkish-language films
Films about farmers
Films set in İzmir
Animal cruelty incidents in film
Golden Bear winners
Films directed by Metin Erksan
Films directed by David E. Durston
Films shot in İzmir